Gulshan-e-Ravi (The Garden of Ravi) is a residential neighbourhood and union council (UC 75, 77, 78) located in the Samanabad Zone of Lahore, Punjab, Pakistan. 

Gulshan-e-Ravi  
is divided into several blocks (A, B, C, D, E, F, G, H).

References

Zones in Lahore
Populated places in Lahore District